The 2021 Nordic Golf League was the 23rd season of the Nordic Golf League (NGL), one of four third-tier tours recognised by the European Tour. The season started with events in Spain. The schedule was subject to change and several tournaments were cancelled or postponed due to the COVID-19 pandemic.

Schedule
The following table lists official events during the 2021 season.

Order of Merit
The Order of Merit was titled as the GolfBox Road to Europe and was based on prize money won during the season, calculated using a points-based system. The top five players on the tour (not otherwise exempt) earned status to play on the 2022 Challenge Tour.

See also
2021 Danish Golf Tour
2021 Swedish Golf Tour

Notes

References

Nordic Golf League